Adasi is a small village in Gondia district, Maharashtra state, India.

References

Villages in Gondia district